A trade prohibition is a restriction in which one country will not buy goods from another country unless certain standards are met or conditions are followed, such as labor standards and environmental standards. It is the opposite of a trade preference. An example would be a ban on goods produced from forced labor.

See also
Most favored nation
National treatment
Trade mandate
Trade preference
Trade sanctions

Commercial policy
Protectionism